5C or 5c may refer to:

 5C Situation analysis: Company, Competitors, Customers, Collaborators, Climate
 5-C (Five County), an Idaho juvenile detention center for high-risk individuals
 CAL Cargo Air Lines IATA code
 Chromosome Conformation Capture Carbon Copy, or 5C, an extension of the Chromosome conformation capture (3C) method used in genomics
 Fifth Cambridge Survey of Radio Sources
 Five Cs of Singapore, a cultural term relating to materialism
 Five-cent coin
 The consortium of the five Claremont Colleges
 Five Company (5C) Digital Transmission Content Protection
 The iPhone 5C, a smartphone designed and marketed by Apple Inc.
 The Honor 5C
5C, the production code for the 1978 Doctor Who serial The Stones of Blood

See also
C5 (disambiguation)